Haplochrois ochraceella is a species of moth of the family Elachistidae. It is found in southern and central Europe.

The wingspan is 10–15 mm. Adults have been recorded from the beginning of June to the beginning of August.

The food plant is unknown.

References

External links
Lepiforum e. V.

Moths described in 1903
Elachistidae
Moths of Europe